Dwarf barb is a common name of several different tropical freshwater fish species, including:

 Enteromius brevidorsalis
 Puntius gelius
 Puntius phutunio